José Maria 'Chema' Mato Nieto (born 22 March 1984) is a Spanish footballer who plays for CD Bezana as a midfielder.

Club career
Born in Santander, Cantabria, Mato made his senior debuts with Deportivo Rayo Cantabria in the 2003–04 season, in Tercera División. A season later, he joined Racing de Santander, being assigned to the reserves also in the fourth level. He also appeared two times with the first team (against Real Madrid on 21 December 2005 and against Real Betis on 17 June 2007), only limited to the bench, however.

On 17 August 2007 Mato signed with Racing de Ferrol, in Segunda División. He made his division debut on 2 September, starting in a 3–1 away win over Polideportivo Ejido. Mato scored his first professional goal on 5 April 2008, the first of a 2–1 home win over Celta de Vigo.

Mato played in Segunda División B but also in the fourth level in the following seasons, representing Cultural y Deportiva Leonesa, Rayo Cantabria, CF Villanovense, Real Balompédica Linense, CD Guadalajara and CD Tudelano.

References

External links

Chema Mato at La Preferente

1984 births
Living people
People from Santander, Spain
Spanish footballers
Footballers from Cantabria
Association football midfielders
Segunda División players
Segunda División B players
Tercera División players
Deportivo Rayo Cantabria players
Rayo Cantabria players
Racing de Ferrol footballers
Cultural Leonesa footballers
CF Villanovense players
Real Balompédica Linense footballers
CD Guadalajara (Spain) footballers
CD Tudelano footballers
Mérida AD players